Martha E. Bernal (April 13, 1931, San Antonio, Texas – September 28, 2001) was an American clinical psychologist. She earned her doctoral degree at Indiana University Bloomington in 1962. She was the first Latina to receive a doctorate degree in psychology in the United States. She helped with the treatment and assessment of children with behavioral problems and worked to develop organizations that have a focus on ethnic groups.

Childhood
Born to Mexican Immigrants in San Antonio, Texas in 1931, Martha Bernal was raised in Mexican culture while experiencing life as a Mexican American. At first her father, Enrique de Bernal, did not want her to continue her educational pursuits, but with the support of her older sister, Cristina, and her mother, Alicia, her father eventually relented.

Education
Bernal entered elementary school in 1939 and went on to graduate from El Paso High School. Her school prohibited speaking Spanish and she and her sisters were discouraged from taking academically advanced courses. Bernal said that environment led her to feel shame about her ethnicity and native tongue.

In 1952 Bernal received a bachelor's degree from Texas Western College, which is now the University of Texas at El Paso. She then attended Syracuse University and graduated with a Master of Arts degree in 1955. Moving on to Indiana University, she struggled with sexism. While the white males were welcome to conduct faculty-supervised research, females were denied such opportunities and often subject to sexual advances from professors. Bernal was ready to quit Indiana University until one of her teachers, Harry Yamaguchi, persuaded her to finish her doctorate. She eventually earned her doctorate in psychology with the additional support of other faculty members, Roland C. Davis, Arnold Binder, and Leon.

Work
After obtaining her doctoral degree from Indiana University in 1962, Dr. Martha E. Bernal applied for various faculty jobs. Unable to get a faculty position, she obtained a U.S. Public Health Service Postdoctoral Fellowship at UCLA and conducted research for two years. Dr. Bernal faced systemic racism, discrimination and sexual harassment in the workplace. Many corporations and universities denied Dr. Bernal employment due to her gender. During that time period sexism was prevalent in the workplace and it was not highly acceptable to hire a woman as a faculty member. Eventually, she became a faculty member at Arizona State University where she would study ethic identity development among Mexican American children. During this time she developed her interest in the behavioral principles and methods to the treatment of childhood psychopathology, mainly children suffering from conduct disorders as well as developed mechanisms used for measuring ethic identity and the development of ethnic identity among Mexican American children. Eventually she became known nationally for displaying how behavioral interventions for children operate and the intervention's ability to operate overtime as well as for developing the Ethnic Identity Questionnaire. Dr. Bernal and her colleagues adapted the Ethic Identity Questionnaire to measure ethnic identity development among young Mexican American children. She worked from 1964 to 1971 in the UCLA's Neuropsychiatric Institute developing behavioral interventions and then continued her work at the University of Denver from 1971 to 1986. Some of the interventions involved training parents by giving them lesson plans to help with their children's conduct problems.

Contributions to psychology
Shortly after she started research in minority mental health, Bernal became the lead researcher on the topic of training minority psychologists. She documented information from the journals American Psychologist and The Counseling Psychologist about how there were low numbers of minority students and very few courses about minorities in psychology programs across the U.S. She fought for the need to prepare mental health professionals to provide services to the growth of ethnic minorities in the United States. Bernal was very outspoken when it came to recruiting and training more ethnic minorities in the field of psychology. She worked to incorporate specific organizations into the APA that had a focus on ethnic issues. Her research convinced many people in the APA to form the Board of Ethnic Minority Affairs (BEMA).

Bernal made numerous contributions to the field of psychology. She received quite a few awards for her developments on children's clinical work and due to her experiences with the prejudices of society at large, she made a huge difference in the recruitment of Hispanics into her field and to the treatment of minorities in the United States. She received the Distinguished Life Achievement Award from APA's Division 45, and APA's Distinguished Contribution to Psychology in the Public Interest Award in 2001, just to name a few. She also contributed much to the establishment of the National Hispanic Psychology Association, now known as the National Latino Psychological Association, where she became the second president and eventually the treasurer. One of her most notable accomplishment is the teaching and mentoring of numerous students. She helped her students deal with the things that she had struggled with throughout her life. She has scholarships in her name that assist minority students, especially women, with college. She wanted to help students have equal opportunities for advancement in psychology. She has gained extensive acknowledgments from the people she has interacted with, becoming an inspiration to many of her followers and peers.

Death
In her later years, Bernal battled cancer and was eventually forced to stop her work due to the decline of her health. However, she continued to be an influential leader by working with the Commission on Ethnic Minority in the fields of recruitment, retention and training, remaining an active member until her death. After battling, and recovering from cancer three times, she was diagnosed with lung cancer and died at the age of 70 on September 28, 2001.

References

1931 births
2001 deaths
American clinical psychologists
Indiana University Bloomington alumni
University of Texas at El Paso alumni
Syracuse University alumni
Arizona State University faculty
University of Denver faculty
People from San Antonio
People from El Paso, Texas
Hispanic and Latino American social scientists